The Journal of the History of Economic Thought is a quarterly peer-reviewed academic journal publishing articles and book reviews on the areas of history of economics, as well as its methodology. It is published by Cambridge University Press on behalf of the History of Economics Society. The journal was established in 1979 as History of Economics Society Bulletin, obtaining its current title in 1990. The editors-in-chief are Pedro Garcia Duarte (University of São Paulo, Brazil) and Jimena Hurtado (Universidad de los Andes, Colombia).

References

Cambridge University Press academic journals
Publications established in 1979